Love, Charlie is the sixth studio album by American singer Charlie Wilson. It was released on January 25, 2013 by RCA Records. The album debuted at number 4 on the US Billboard 200, and atop the Top R&B/Hip-Hop Albums, selling 44,000 copies for the week. As of January 2015, the album has sold 211,000 copies in the US.

Track listing

Personnel
Credits for Love, Charlie adapted from Allmusic.

Clarice Bell-Strayhorn - Composer
Dennis Bettis - Composer
Jacki Brown - Grooming, Hair Stylist
Jimmy Burney - Composer
Josh Cheuse - Art Direction, Design
Kamilah Chevel - Vocals (Background)
Rob Chiarelli - Mixing
Carl M. Days Jr. - Composer
DJ Wayne Williams - A&R
Emile Ghantous - Composer, Editing, Engineer, Producer, Vocal Arrangement
Dominic Gomez - Composer, Vocal Arrangement
Eric Grant - Composer
Denise Hudson - Vocals (Background)
The Insomniax - Programming
Tom Kahre - Mixing Assistant
Lance Tolbert - Bass, Composer, Piano, Programming
Marlon McClain - Guitars

Wirlie Morris - Composer, Editing, Engineer, Producer, Programming, Vocal Producer, Vocals (Background)
Erik Nelson - Bass, Composer, Guitars, Producer, Vocal Arrangement
Greg Pagani - Composer, Editing, Engineer, Producer, Programming
Michael Paran - A&R, Composer, Production Coordination
Aliesh Pierce - Grooming, Hair Stylist
Herb Powers, Jr. - Mastering
Brinson Poythress - Guitars
Edwin "Lil Eddie" Serrano - Composer, Vocals (Background)
William Serrano - Composer
Charlie Singleton - Composer, Engineer, Producer, Vocals (Background)
James R. Smith - Composer
Randee St. Nicholas - Photography
Keith Sweat - Featured Artist
Pamela Watson - Stylist
Charlie Wilson - Composer, Executive Producer, Primary Artist, Producer, Vocal Arrangement, Vocals, Vocals (Background)
Mahin Wilson - A&R, Composer

Charts

Weekly charts

Year-end charts

References

External links
 
 Official website

2013 albums
Charlie Wilson (singer) albums